This is a list of superhero TV shows produced by American studios by year to the present.

Live-action

Animated Series

References